Gold teeth are a form of dental prosthesis where the visible part of a tooth is replaced or capped with a prosthetic molded from gold.

History
The academic paper titled "Gold Work, Filing and Blackened Teeth: Dental Modifications in Luzon" describes tooth accessories, ornamentation, and/or appliances as an ancient practice which dates back as far as 4,000 years ago in Southeast Asia. Changing or filing the teeth and beautifying them (ie with gold or blackening) could be seen as a way to show one's status.  Early traces of gold teeth were found in the 1300-1400s. They were found in Luzon, an island in the Philippines. 

Gold dental appliances have gone in and out of popularity as a status symbol for many years. Archeologists also found gold dental appliances from the Etruscan people of Italy, as early as 630 BCE, interpreting them to be some of the earliest forms of bridges and replacement teeth.
Gold wire was used in dentistry in ancient times, and for filling cavities in the 19th century. Gold is suitable for dentistry because it is malleable, nearly immune to corrosion, and closely mimics the hardness of natural teeth, thereby causing no harm to natural teeth during chewing. Gold was used before silver became available and has continued to be used for specialized purposes. Dental restorations are often made from a combination of precious metals. 

As the dental industry adopted CAD/CAM processes for most of the crown and bridge fabrication, gold manufacturing still relied on the ancient "lost wax" technique, which requires a significant amount of time, skill, and labor. Recent developments have seen the advent of CAD/CAM milling of 100 mm diameter pucks of dental alloy to facilitate the direct milling of crowns and bridges from the solid puck. This effectively eliminated the risk and difficulty of the lost wax process and simultaneously improved upon the quality of the devices.

World War II

In Auschwitz: A Doctor's Eyewitness Account, concentration camp survivor Dr. Miklós Nyiszli (who served on Dr. Josef Mengele's medical kommando) describes the "tooth-pulling kommando". These teams of eight, all "fine stomatologists and dental surgeons" equipped "in one hand with a lever, and in the other a pair of pliers for extracting teeth", worked in the crematoria.  Stationed in front of the ovens, their job was to pry open the mouths of prisoners who had been gassed and extract, or break off, "all gold teeth, as well as any gold bridgework and fillings". The teeth were collected and stored at the camp before being sent on to the Reichsbank to be melted down and converted into gold bullion, which could then be sold with no trace of its origin.

United States

Gold alloys are still used by dentists today per Healthline. They most often combine gold with other metals such as palladium, nickel, or chromium to increase the strength of the crown and reduce its cost.

Historical information:
 
"In the 1800s, dentists started to use gold as material for filling teeth." Gold fillings are thought to be older than "amalgam fillings, and by extension, that makes them much older than composite or porcelain fillings."

According to the Wall Street Journal, Dr. Ruchi Sahota, a dentist in Fremont, Calif., reports that gilded canines and incisors were common throughout the early and mid 1900s. “Gold was used very, very often, for routine dental procedures" for people. 

Britannica cites American dentist William Taggart who in 1907 introduced a precision machine that allowed dentists to create gold restorations with minimal tooth removal. "

According to National Geographic, immigrants from Africa had gold dental work due to its then low-cost and it was commonly seen in the neighborhood of Brooklyn and the Bronx. Native New Yorkers began to see it as a fashion statement especially with the rise of hiphop in the 1980s. Grills went mainstream in the 1990's with Vietnamese immigrant Johnny Dang creating "blinged out versions."

South Africa

Gold teeth in South Africa have become part of the South African fashion culture. Gold teeth are very popular in the country with people getting permanent gold teeth from as young as 12 years old.

Gold teeth became a big trend in South Africa in the late 1960s among the Coloured and Black South African communities.

Permanent Gold teeth in South Africa is not considered a sign of wealth like in other countries, but a fashion trend.

Since the end of Apartheid in many white Afrikaans people and Indian people in the country have also started getting permanent gold teeth.

The trend of permanent gold teeth is so big in South Africa that many politicians, celebrities and even pastors have them.

Popular belief is that gold will scare away evil spirits (with it being a representation of light in South African culture), the Tikoloshe was said to be afraid of the light and gold teeth wearers were generally very superstitious.

Current use

In many regions of the world, including some parts of Eastern Europe, Central Asia, and the Caucasus Regions, gold teeth are also worn as a status symbol. They are considered a symbol of wealth and sometimes installed in the place of healthy teeth or as crowns over filed-down healthy teeth.

Grills

Grills, false tooth covers made of metal, have become a popular hip hop fashion in the United States since the 1980s in New York City. In the early 2000s, grills were again popularized in hip hop videos by Nelly, Three 6 Mafia, Lil Wayne, Ludacris, Paul Wall, and other rappers from the southern U.S. Gold grills are still being sported by rappers today and even include diamonds of various colors. Grills were also worn by Miley Cyrus, Beyonce, and Madonna. While some rap musicians have had their gold teeth permanently attached to existing teeth, most people who purchase them for aesthetic purposes opt for removable gold teeth caps.  In 2005, Nelly released the rap single "Grillz" which promotes the dental procedure.

See also

 Dental restoration
 Grill
 Prosthodontics
 Status symbol

Notes

Further reading

External links 

Restorative dentistry
Dental modification